The Electoral district of Loddon was one of the original sixteen electoral districts of the old unicameral Victorian Legislative Council of 1851 to 1856. Victoria being a colony in Australia at the time.

The Electoral district of Loddon's area was defined as: "Bounded on the south by the Counties of Dalhousie Talbot and Ripon from the Goulburn River to the source of the Avoca River on the west by the Avoca River to Lake Bael Bael and thence by a line due north to the River Murray on the north and north-east by the River Murray and the Goulburn River and on the east by the Goulburn River."

Members
One member originally, two from the expansion of the Council in 1853.

 = resigned

References

Former electoral districts of Victorian Legislative Council
1851 establishments in Australia
1856 disestablishments in Australia